Sheptycki is a surname. Notable people with the surname include:

Andrey Sheptytsky (also Andrzej Szeptycki; 1865-1944), Metropolitan Archbishop of the Ukrainian Greek Catholic Church
James Sheptycki, Canadian criminologist
Leo Sheptycki (1717–1779), bishop of the Ruthenian Uniate Church